West Newton is an unincorporated community in Wabasha County, Minnesota, United States.

Notes

Unincorporated communities in Wabasha County, Minnesota
Unincorporated communities in Minnesota